Neopetrolisthes maculatus is a species of porcelain crab from the Indo-Pacific region. It is a small, colourful crustacean with a porcelain-like shell. This porcelain crab is usually found within the stinging tentacles of a number of sea anemone species.

References

External links
 

Porcelain crabs
Crustaceans of the Indian Ocean
Crustaceans of the Pacific Ocean
Crustaceans described in 1837
Taxa named by Henri Milne-Edwards